United Christian Hospital (UCH) is a 250-bed hospital teaching hospital located in Lahore, Pakistan.

History
It was established in the 1960s. Presbyterian Church purchased the land, Methodist Church with the help of Anglican Church constructed the building.

It is affiliated with the Church of Pakistan.

History
In 1964, Pakistan's first open-heart surgery was performed in the hospital.

References

Hospitals in Lahore
Church of Pakistan
Christian hospitals